Annabel Cervantes Muñoz (born 1969 in Barcelona) is a Spanish-Catalan writer in the Catalan language.

She studied Geography and History at the University of Barcelona, with a major in the environment, but she left this occupation to dedicate herself to literature. She currently lives in Castelldefels.

Works
L'harmònica de vidre, 1999
L'informe del cartògraf, 2000
Qualsevol diumenge, esports d'aventura, 2004
Ocell de mar endins, 2007.
Celobert, 2008.
La Maledicció d'Alietzer. Alisis (Ara Llibres). Barcelona, 2009.

Awards 
Premi Sant Jordi, Castelldefels 1999
Premi Sant Jordi, Begues, 2000
 Primer Premi de Narrativa Mercè Rodoreda de Molins de Rei, 2004
 IV Premi Pollença de Narrativa, 2007
 III Premi de Narrativa Breu Districte V, 2008

Last Award 
 "Reflexos d'Estiu", Novel. Short-listed on Premi Narrativa Delta, 2011

Recent works 
 "Crims.cat 2.0", 2013. AlRevés. "Negra nit al carrer de l'Aurora" . Anthology of thriller's stories in Països Catalans.

External links
 Ocell de mar endins
 Castelldefels
 La Maledicció d'Alietzer

1969 births
Living people
Women writers from Catalonia
Spanish women novelists
University of Barcelona alumni
20th-century Spanish women writers
20th-century Spanish novelists
21st-century Spanish women writers
21st-century Spanish novelists